Alamarathupatty is a village in Tamil Nadu state of India. It is located in the Athoor Taluk of Dindigul district. It is located 7 km (NH - 7) towards south from district headquarters Dindigul.

Geography 
This place is at an average altitude of 309 meters above sea level.

Demographics 
India's 2011 census, 3,717  ( 1,861 men, 1,856 women ) people living in this village.  The average literacy rate is 80.57% of the people in this village. This is 77.41% of literacy than the national average.

Adjacent communities

Reference 

Villages in Dindigul district